Yang Sena (born 30 January 1999) is a South Korean footballer who plays as a midfielder for Portuguese club Sporting da Covilhã.

Career statistics

Club
.

Notes

References

1999 births
Living people
Momoyama Gakuin University alumni
South Korean footballers
South Korean expatriate footballers
Japanese footballers
Japanese expatriate footballers
Association football midfielders
Sagan Tosu players
S.C. Braga players
Académico de Viseu F.C. players
S.C. Covilhã players
Liga Portugal 2 players
South Korean expatriate sportspeople in Portugal
Expatriate footballers in Portugal